The Hawley–Green Historical District is in the Near Northeast neighborhood of Syracuse, New York. The name comes from the district's two principal streets, Hawley Avenue and Green Street.  As Hawley–Green Street Historic District, the district was listed on the National Register of Historic Places in 1979. In 2018 its boundaries were increased to include a number of adjacent streets with similarly styled buildings.

History

Tucked away in a triangle that some refer to as the "LBJ" triangle, since its borders consist of Lodi Street, Burnet Avenue, and James Street, the major artery of Syracuse's northeastern neighborhoods, Hawley–Green was at first home to carpenters, wagon makers, silversmiths, painters, and musicians. Its original housing stock consisted of splendid Greek Revival, Gothic Revival, and Italianate-style structures, some of which still line its charming streets. By the late nineteenth century the neighborhood had attracted more upperclass types who replaced many of the original structures with Second Empire, Queen Anne, and the Stick Style homes. The arrival of the streetcar helped fuel this upscale transition. These newer residents were doctors, lawyers, dentists, politicians, and clergy.

, a neighborhood on the upswing, many of the homes have been restored, the larger ones converted into multi-unit apartment houses, the smaller ones home to a growing artistic community. The area has become famous for its painted ladies, Victorian homes repainted in pastel colors. In 1979 the district was placed on the National Register of Historic Places. The district has been home to the Syracuse Cultural Workers since 2002 and ArtRage Gallery since 2008.

An LGBT-friendly neighborhood

About forty of the residents of the neighborhood are members of the Hawley–Green LGBT (Lesbian, Gay, Bisexual, or Transgender) Neighbors. This neighborhood group promotes the neighborhood as LGBT-friendly.

References

 Hawley-Green Historic District on Syracuse Then and Now

External links
 The Northeast Hawley Development Association
 Hawley-Green on NAVIGAYTION
 Hawley–Green neighbors

Queen Anne architecture in New York (state)
Italianate architecture in New York (state)
Neighborhoods in Syracuse, New York
Gay villages in New York (state)
Historic districts in Onondaga County, New York
Historic districts on the National Register of Historic Places in New York (state)
National Register of Historic Places in Syracuse, New York